Maria Orav (born 7 April 1996) is an Estonian footballer who plays as a defender for Tallinna Kalev and the Estonia women's national team.

Career
She made her debut for the Estonia national team on 27 February 2019 against Malta, starting the match.

References

1996 births
Living people
Women's association football defenders
Estonian women's footballers
Estonia women's international footballers
Footballers from Tallinn
JK Tallinna Kalev (women) players